The 15th Pan American Games were held in Rio de Janeiro, Brazil from 13 to 29 July 2007.

Medals

Bronze

Men's Team Competition: Paraguay national futsal team

Results by event

Football

Women's Competition

Group B

Futsal

Group A

Semifinals

Bronze Medal

Handball

Women's Competition

Group A

Classification 5-8

Classification 7-8

See also
Paraguay at the 2008 Summer Olympics

External links
Rio 2007 Official website

Nations at the 2007 Pan American Games
2007 in Paraguayan sport
2003